Jason David Roy is an American singer and musician who is best known as the lead vocalist for the American Christian rock band Building 429. The band has produced nine albums over an eighteen-year career. The band has also been nominated for a Grammy Award, three Gospel Music Association's Dove Awards and won New Artist of the Year in 2005. They also won the award for BMI Christian Song of the Year in 2013.

Background 

Jason Roy was born in Mount Pleasant, Texas. When he was four years old, his parents divorced; he moved with his mother, who later remarried. During his childhood, he missed his father.

Building 429 was started by Jason Roy and bassist Scotty Beshears, and later teamed up with drummer Christian Fuhrer who left the band in 2002 and was replaced by Saul Johnson. In 2000, they released their self-titled album. In 2001, they added a second guitarist, Paul Bowden, who was later replaced by Jesse Garcia. When Saul Johnson left in 2003, Michael Anderson took over. Scotty Beshears, one of the founding members, left the band in 2007 and was replaced by Aaron Branch. The band's current lineup is: Roy (lead singer), Anderson (drums), Garcia (guitar) and Branch (bass). Roy has served as worship pastor at Grace Community Church in Clarksville, Tennessee. He is also a songwriter, lyricist and producer, having worked with artists such as NewSong, Pillar, and Decyfer Down.

See also
 Building 429

References

American male singers
American performers of Christian music
Living people
Year of birth missing (living people)